The Ministry of Labour, Solidarity and Social Security ( or MTSS)  is a Portuguese government ministry. The ministry has changed the breadth of its responsibilities under various governmentsfor the purposes of this article, the focus is the core responsibility for "Labour", which has been termed "Employment" under some mandates, as responsibility for "Social Security" has been separated out in some mandates. The Portuguese term Solidariedade is roughly equivalent to "Technical or Vocational Training", ensuring that citizens have the "Qualification"s (a term also used) for employment in the trades. (see Solidarity (Polish trade union), Solidarity (South African trade union), Solidarity (British trade union))

The current Minister of Labour, Solidarity and Social Security in the XXII Constitutional Government is Ana Mendes Godinho, since 26 October 2019.

List of ministers
 Francisco Marcelo Curto (1976–1977), Minister of Labour
 António Maldonado Gonelha (1977–1978), Minister of Labour
 António da Costa Leal (1978), Minister of Labour
 Eusébio Marques de Carvalho (1978–1979), Minister of Labour 
 Jorge Sá Borges (1979–1980), Minister of Labour 
 Eusébio Marques de Carvalho (1980–1981), Minister of Labour 
 Henrique Nascimento Rodrigues (1981), Minister of Labour 
 António Queirós Martins (1981–1982), Minister of Labour 
 Luís Morales (1982–1983), Minister of Labour
 Amândio de Azevedo (1983–1985), Minister of Labour and Social Security
 Luís Mira Amaral (1985–1987), Minister of Labour and Social Security
 José Albino Silva Peneda (1987–1993), Minister for Employment and Social Security
 José Falcão e Cunha (1993–1995), Minister for Employment and Social Security
 Maria João Rodrigues (1995–1997), Minister for Qualification and Employment
 Eduardo Ferro Rodrigues (1997–2001), Minister of Labour and Solidarity
 Paulo Pedroso (2001–2002), Minister of Labour and Solidarity
 António Bagão Félix (2002–2004), Minister of Social Security and Labour
 Álvaro Barreto (2004–2005), Minister of State, Economic Activities and Labour
 José António Vieira da Silva (2005–2009), Minister of Labour and Social Security
 Helena André (2009–2011), Minister of Labour and Social Security
 Pedro Mota Soares (2011–2015)
2011–2013, Minister of Solidarity and Social Security
2013–2015, Minister of Solidarity, Employment and Social Security
 José António Vieira da Silva (2015–2019), Minister of Labour, Solidarity and Social Security
 Ana Mendes Godinho (incumbent, 2019–), Minister of Labour, Solidarity and Social Security

External links
  

Labor in Portugal
Portugal
Portugal
Labour and Social Solidarity